Zhou Min (born 16 December 1997) is a Chinese swimmer. She competed in the women's 400 metre individual medley event at the 2016 Summer Olympics held in Rio de Janeiro, Brazil.

References

External links
 

1997 births
Living people
Olympic swimmers of China
Swimmers at the 2016 Summer Olympics
Swimmers at the 2014 Asian Games
Swimmers at the 2018 Asian Games
Asian Games competitors for China
Chinese female medley swimmers
21st-century Chinese women